The 2012 Women's European Water Polo Championship took place at the Pieter van den Hoogenband Swim Stadium in Eindhoven, the Netherlands, from January 18 to 28, 2012.

Italy won their fifth title by defeating Greece 13-10 in the final. Hungary captured the bronze medal after a 9-8 win over Russia.

Road to the 2012 Olympics
The championships was part of the qualification procedure for the 2012 London Olympics that will take place in late July and early August of that year. There will be 8 women's teams in the Olympic competition.

By the time that these championships took place, three women's places have already been booked: the winner of the Pan American Games in Guadalajara (Mexico), the Australian team for Oceania (not contested) and the British team, as host nation.

As Great Britain women's team has been entered into the Olympic competition, there was not a direct entry to the Olympic tournament from the European Championships. Six women's teams will be entered into a world-wide qualifying competition from 1–8 April 2012 for men in Edmonton, Canada and from 15–22 April for women in Trieste (Italy). Four teams from this competition qualified for the Olympic tournament.

Qualification

Squads

Draw 
The draw was held on November 12, 2011.

Groups

Preliminary round

Group A
All times are CET (UTC+1).

Group B
All times are CET (UTC+1).

Final round
Bracket

Quarterfinals
All times are CET (UTC+1).

Semifinals
All times are CET (UTC+1).

7th place match
All times are CET (UTC+1).

5th place match
All times are CET (UTC+1).

Bronze medal match
All times are CET (UTC+1).

Gold medal match
All times are CET (UTC+1).

Final ranking

Team Roster
Elena Gigli, Simona Abbate, Elisa Casanova, Rosaria Aiello, Elisa Queirolo, Allegra Lapi, Tania Di Mario, Roberta Bianconi, Giulia Emmolo, Giulia Rambaldi, Aleksandra Cotti, Teresa Frassinetti, Giulia Gorlero. Head coach: Fabio Conti

Awards and statistics

Top goalscorers

Individual awards

Most Valuable Player

Top Scorer
 — 19 goals

References

External links

LEN website

Women
2012
2012
Women's water polo in the Netherlands
Waterpolo
Euro
January 2012 sports events in Europe
2012 Women's European Water Polo
2012 Women's European Water Polo